Wáldo Ariel Kantor (born January 11, 1960) is a retired volleyball player from Argentina, who represented his native country at the 1984 Summer Olympics in Los Angeles, California and the 1988 Summer Olympics in Seoul. In Seoul, Kantor won the bronze medal with the men's national team.
He started played soccer at All Boys, and then decided to play volleyball at IL Peretz from Villa Lynch. He was also a great chinchon player, and also a knew how to make goods asados.

With Ferro Carril Oeste he obtained the Morgan Cup of 1979, and the national championships of 1980 and 1981.
Kantor received 2 Konex Awards volleyball merit diplomas (1990 and 2000)

After retirement, he became a successful coach with Argentine first division Bolivar Buenos Aires, winning the 2007/2008 championship. He also played at Mendele from Loma Hermosa, where he defeated different teams from the area, such as villa piagio, los matreros, and River

Club history

References

DirecTV Bolivar returns to training

External links
 

1960 births
Living people
Place of birth missing (living people)
Argentine Jews
Jewish Argentine sportspeople
Argentine men's volleyball players
Jewish volleyball players
Olympic volleyball players of Argentina
Volleyball players at the 1984 Summer Olympics
Volleyball players at the 1988 Summer Olympics
Olympic bronze medalists for Argentina
Olympic medalists in volleyball
Medalists at the 1988 Summer Olympics
Pan American Games medalists in volleyball
Pan American Games bronze medalists for Argentina
Medalists at the 1983 Pan American Games